Offshoot Films is a Suffolk-based digital media company. Formed in 2006, the company provided film editing facilities for such Australian films as The Last Days of Chez Nous and Spotswood. The company also provided video productions for high schools such as Ipswich High School and Whitton School. One such production, made by students at Sudbury Upper School and Great Cornard Upper School, was a commercial urging high school students to make the choice of post-secondary education or training that best suits them. Offshoot has partnered with primary schools as well to found a project which allows students from the ages of five to eleven create their own films and take them home on DVDs. In June 2009, Offshoot presented a workshop about education and media at Explore and Engage, a Creative and Media Diploma Event hosted by LSN.

References

Companies based in Suffolk
Digital media organizations
Film editing